Mount Chapman is a mountain in Antarctica. It was named by the Advisory Committee on Antarctic Names for William H. Chapman of the U.S. Geological Survey (USGS), a cartographer with the Horlick Mountains Traverse (1958–59), who made a survey of the Whitmore Mountains on Jan. 2, 1959. Chapman spent several summer seasons in the Antarctic, including a survey in the Pensacola Mountains (1957–58) and the highly successful USGS Topo North-South Survey of the mountains bordering the west side of the Ross Sea and Ross Ice Shelf.

References

Chapman